Silvana Katharina Chojnowski (born 17 April 1994) is a football striker, currently playing for Köln in the Bundesliga and the Poland women's national football team. She holds both German and Polish Citizenship.

As an Under-17 international she played the 2010 U-17 European Championship and the 2010 U-17 World Cup, scoring in both as a member of the German squad. As of 2016 she plays for Poland's women's national football team.

References

External links
 

1994 births
Living people
German women's footballers
German people of Polish descent
TSG 1899 Hoffenheim (women) players
1. FFC Frankfurt players
Polish women's footballers
Poland women's international footballers
Footballers from Frankfurt
SC Sand players
Women's association football forwards
1. FC Köln (women) players